Charles Burrell (born October 4, 1920) is a classical and jazz bass player most prominently known for being the first African-American to be a member of a major American symphony (the Denver Symphony Orchestra, now known as the Colorado Symphony). For this accomplishment he is often referred to as "the Jackie Robinson of Classical Music".

Early life 
Charles was born in Toledo, Ohio, and raised in depression-era Detroit, Michigan. In grade school, he excelled in music. When he was twelve years old, he heard the SFS under renowned conductor Pierre Monteux on his family's crystal radio, and vowed to one day play as a member of the orchestra under his direction.

Start of musical career 
After high school, Burrell landed a job playing jazz at a club called B.J.'s in Detroit's Paradise Valley. At the start of World War II, he was drafted into an all-black naval unit located at Great Lakes Naval base near Chicago. He played in the unit's all-star band with Clark Terry, Al Grey, and O. C. Johnson, and took classes at Northwestern University and with the Chicago Symphony Orchestra.

Career as an orchestral and jazz musician 
In 1949, Burrell joined his mother's relatives in Denver, Colorado, and was soon hired by the Denver Symphony Orchestra,. In 1959 he fulfilled his dream of playing for Pierre Monteux by joining the SFS and remained there until 1965. According to the book "Music for a City Music for the World: 100 Years with the San Francisco Symphony", he charmed his way into an audition with the orchestra after a chance meeting in the street with Philip Karp, the principal bassist for the Symphony, while on vacation in San Francisco.

He was called the first African-American to become a member of such a prestigious orchestra, and thus has been referred to as "the Jackie Robinson of classical music".

According to Jet Magazine and Indianapolis Recorder articles in 1953, he quit playing in the Denver Symphony to become the bass player in Nellie Lutcher's band. He went on to become a prominent jazz player in the scene of Five Points, Denver, and was featured in the PBS documentary on the subject. At that time, the Jazz scene in Five Points was the only one between St. Louis and the West Coast, so it became one of the most alive in the country, often being referred to as "The Harlem of the West". He played in the first integrated jazz trio in Colorado, the Al Rose Trio. He rose to be a central player in the Five Points jazz scene by becoming the house bass player at the Rossonian Hotel, considered the "entertainment central" spot in Five Points during that era. He shared the stage with jazz legends such as Billie Holiday, Erroll Garner, Charlie Parker, Earl Hines, Duke Ellington, Count Bassie, and Lionel Hampton as well as Gene Harris.

He is also noted as the teacher and mentor of bass player Ray Brown and multi-Grammy Award-winning vocalist Dianne Reeves (who is also his niece). Keyboardist George Duke (a cousin) also credited Burrell for being the person that convinced him to give up classical music and switch to jazz. Duke explained that he "wanted to be free" and Burrell "more or less made the decision for me" by convincing him to "improvise and do what you want to do".

He still performed well into his 90s, including playing live in the studio of prominent Jazz radio station KUVO, and was recently one of the two grand marshals that led the kick-off parade at the Five Points Jazz Festival.

Awards and tributes
 In 2008, he received a Denver Mayor's award for excellence in Arts and Culture.
 In 2011, he received a Martin Luther King Jr. humanitarian award 
 Prominent Jazz radio station KUVO broadcast a tribute concert to him on his birthday.  
 Congresswoman Diana DeGette also led a tribute to him on the floor of the United States House of Representatives in honor of his 90th birthday, referring to him as a "titan of the classical and jazz bass"
 The Alphonse Robinson African-American Music Association named the "Charles Burrell Award" after him,
 On November 28, 2017, he was inducted into the Colorado Music Hall of Fame

Discography 
 Don Ewell: Denver Concert (Pumpkin)
 Marie Rhines : Tartans & Sagebrush (Ladyslipper)
 Whiskey Blanket: No Object
 Joan Tower / Colorado Symphony Orchestra, Marin Alsop – Fanfares For The Uncommon Woman (Koch International Classics)

Bibliography
Charlie Burrell, Mitch Handelsman, The Life of Charlie Burrell: Breaking the Color Barrier in Classical Music, CreateSpace Independent Publishing Platform (October 29, 2014)

References

External links

Documentary Charlie Burrell, American symphonies’ first black musician
Transcript of tribute to Charles Burell on the floor of the US House of Representatives
PBS documentary on Jazz in Five Points
Documentary Series Voices of the Civil Rights Movement: Integrating a Major U.S. Symphony
1983 KRMA TV broadcast of the Charlie Burrell Trio on the Show 'Glenarm Place'

1920 births
Living people
American jazz bass guitarists
American male bass guitarists
Musicians from Toledo, Ohio
African-American jazz musicians
African-American classical musicians
Northwestern University alumni
20th century in San Francisco
Musicians from the San Francisco Bay Area
20th-century American bass guitarists
Jazz musicians from California
Guitarists from Ohio
Guitarists from California
Jazz musicians from Ohio
Classical musicians from California
Classical musicians from Ohio
20th-century American male musicians
American male jazz musicians
African-American centenarians
American centenarians
Men centenarians
African-American guitarists
United States Navy personnel of World War II
20th-century African-American musicians
21st-century African-American people